Idaville may refer to:
Idaville, Pennsylvania, a town in Pennsylvania
Idaville, Indiana,  a town in Indiana
Idaville,  Oregon, an unincorporated community in Oregon
The fictional hometown of Encyclopedia Brown